Naloxazone is an irreversible μ-opioid receptor antagonist which is selective for the μ1 receptor subtype. Naloxazone produces very long lasting antagonist effects as it forms a covalent bond to the active site of the μ-opioid receptor, thus making it impossible for the molecule to unbind and blocking the receptor permanently until the receptor is recycled by endocytosis.

Naloxazone is the hydrazone analog of naloxone. It has been reported that naloxazone is unstable in acidic solution, dimerizing into the more stable and much more potent antagonist naloxonazine via the free NH2 of the hydrazone to form an azine linkage. Under conditions in which no naloxonazine formation could be detected, naloxazone did not display irreversible μ opioid receptor binding.

See also
 Chlornaltrexamine, an irreversible mixed agonist-antagonist
 Oxymorphazone, an irreversible μ-opioid full agonist

References

Mu-opioid receptor antagonists
4,5-Epoxymorphinans
Phenols
Tertiary alcohols
Cyclohexanols
Allylamines
Ethers
Semisynthetic opioids
Hydrazones
Alkylating agents
Irreversible antagonists